The history of cinema in Eritrea dates back to the country's colonial rule under the Kingdom of Italy. In connection with the growth of Italian cinema in the 1930s, so too did the rise of cinema occur in Asmara, Eritrea. In 1937, Asmara's Opera was converted into a dual-use theatre and cinema. By the following year, Asmara had a total of nine movie theatres.

The Italian missionary film was first introduced in a 1922 work produced in the country by Capuchin monks collaborating with the colonial government. Despite the country's independence, film screenings in Eritrea are mostly still confined to English and Italian language movies.

Films like  were produced in Eritrea and shown the culture and differences between the Eritrean people. Directed by Giuliano Tomei, it was told through a viewpoint of Domenico Meccoli.

European influence continues to this day, such as "European Film Weeks", which have been held annually for the last 15 years. Almost 100% of the films produced in Eritrea fall under the "Fiction" category.

See also
 Cinema Impero, a movie theater in Asmara
 Ines Pellegrini, an Italian actress of Eritrean descent
 White Hotel, a documentary film shot in Eritrea

References

Further reading

 
 
 
 
 

 
Italian Eritrea
Asmara